The 1929 Preston by-election was a parliamentary by-election held in England for the House of Commons constituency of Preston on 31 July 1929.  The seat had become vacant when the Liberal Member of Parliament William Jowitt had resigned his seat after changing his party allegiance.

Standing as a Liberal, Jowitt had won one of Preston's two seats at the general election in May 1929, having previously been Liberal MP for The Hartlepools from 1922 to 1924.  After his return to the Commons in 1929, he was offered the post of Attorney General for England and Wales in the new Labour Government. He accepted the post, but resigned from Parliament and stood for re-election to allow voters to decide whether to accept his change of party.

Jowitt held the seat with an increased majority. The Liberals did not put forward a candidate, being demoralised following Jowitt's defection, and also lacking funds to fight an election.  They did not become a force at parliamentary level in Preston again.

See also
Preston (UK Parliament constituency)
Preston
1903 Preston by-election
1915 Preston by-election
1936 Preston by-election
1940 Preston by-election
1946 Preston by-election
2000 Preston by-election
List of United Kingdom by-elections

References 

 
 

By-elections to the Parliament of the United Kingdom in Lancashire constituencies
1929 elections in the United Kingdom
1929 in England
1920s in Lancashire
Elections in Preston